Euxesta arcuata is a species of ulidiid or picture-winged fly in the genus Euxesta.

References

arcuata
Insects described in 1909